The University of Florida Campus Historic District is a historic district on the campus of the University of Florida in Gainesville, Florida. On April 20, 1989, it was added to the National Register of Historic Places. On June 24, 2008, additional information was approved which resulted in the addition of 6 contributing properties (5 buildings plus the Plaza of the Americas to the district.)

Listed buildings in the district
Note: These were all designed by William Augustus Edwards, although Rolfs Hall was finished by Rudolph Weaver.

Contributing properties in the district
Note: These were designed by Rudolph Weaver, except for University Auditorium, which was designed by William Augustus Edwards.

Added in 2008

Other campus buildings on the National Register

Note: These are outside the district:

Destroyed buildings in the district
 Johnson Hall (originally known as University Commons) was UFs original dining hall. Located west of Dauer, it was designed by William Augustus Edwards, built 1912 and burned 1987. The Academic Advising Center now occupies the site.
 Old Benton Hall (originally the Engineering Building), was designed by William Augustus Edwards, built 1911 and demolished 1966. Grinter Hall, built in 1971, now occupies the site.
 Original Post Office, third building on campus, demolished before 1977 to make way for General Purpose Building A, now Turlington Hall.

Campus landscaping

In 1927 Frederick Law Olmsted, Jr. did a landscape plan for UF. In 1931 the central plaza became the Plaza of the Americas.

See also
 Buildings at the University of Florida
 List of Registered Historic Places in Alachua County, Florida
 Murphree Area

References

External links

Florida's Office of Cultural and Historical Programs - Alachua County
Historic Markers in Alachua County
University of Florida Historic Sites Guide
 UF Preservation Plan & Guidelines for Rehabilitation & New Construction
 UF Historic Campus Brochure and Map: 2 pages

National Register of Historic Places in Gainesville, Florida
University of Florida
 
William Augustus Edwards buildings
Historic districts on the National Register of Historic Places in Florida
1989 establishments in Florida